Tanaina may refer to:
Tanaina, Alaska, a census-designated place
Dena'ina people, an Alaska Native ethnic group
Dena'ina language, an Athabascan language of Alaska